SNH48 is a Chinese idol girl group formed in 2012. , the group consists of  regular members, divided into several teams: Team SII with  members, Team NII with  members, Team HII with  members and Team X with  members.  members are classified as understudies. In addition,  member  listed as overseas trainee.  members are currently listed as on temporary hiatus, although most of them have unofficially resigned.

Members are recruited during auditions that are held roughly every half a year. Initially, they are announced as understudies before being promoted to their various teams, however, this practice was discontinued between 2016 and 2017 during the introduction of its sixth and seventh-generation members, and since 2019, after the second Team Shuffle. When they get older, they "graduate" from the group.

Following AKB48's format, SNH48 holds General Elections every year to determine the popularity of its members. To obtain a ballot, voters have to buy the group's latest "election single", or sign up on its official app. Members that receive higher votes get to be part of the group's next EP and are heavily promoted. The highest-ranked member will not only become the centre performer during the group's live performances, but would also get the opportunity to release a solo EP and music video, and hold a solo concert.

The results from SNH48's annual general elections from 2014 onwards are included. Dark grey cells indicate that the member did not take part in that election. Light grey cells marked "N/A" indicate the member took part in the election but did not rank.

Members are listed by order below as they appear on the official website's roster .

 Also a member of 7Senses
 Also a member of HO2
 Also a member of BlueV

 Also a member of DeMoon

Team SII
Team SII is associated with the color blue. The current captain is Duan Yixuan.

Team NII
Team NII is associated with the color purple. The current captain is Zhao Jiarui .

Team HII
Team HII is associated with the color orange. The current captain is Shen Mengyao.

Team X
Team X is associated with the color light green. The current captain is Yang Bingyi.

Understudies

Overseas Trainees
Members between 16 and 18 are chosen to train at SNH48 Group's overseas idols training center professionally.

Substitute Members

Hiatus
Zhao Jiamin has placed first in the 2nd Senbatsu Elections.

Former members

Star Palace

Honorary Graduates

Former official members

Transferred members

Transferred to BEJ48

Transferred to GNZ48

Transferred to SHY48

Transferred to CKG48

Transferred to IDOLS Ft

Former understudies
 Hu Meiting ( in Jiangsu) Left on December 21, 2012.
 Yu Ting'er ( in Beijing) Left on December 21, 2012.
 He Yichen ( in Jiangsu) Left on May 2, 2013.
 Wang Feisi ( in Beijing) Left on May 3, 2013.
 Chen Li ( in Shanghai) Left on August 18, 2013.
 Zeng Yujia ( in Sichuan) Left on August 18, 2013.
 Zhang Xinfang ( in Hubei) Left on August 18, 2013.
 Yu Huiwen ( in Jiangsu) Left on August 18, 2013.
 Wang Yiwen Rejected from selection on September 5, 2013.
 Xu Tong Rejected from selection on September 5, 2013.
 Zhang Yuwen Rejected from selection on September 5, 2013.
 Yang Haijin ( in Shanghai) Left on November 6, 2013.
 Li Yiwen ( in Shanghai) Left on September 5, 2014.
 Zhang Jin ( in Shanghai) Left on April 4, 2015.
 Ai Yaxuan Rejected from selection on December 4, 2015.
 Wu Xian Rejected from selection on December 4, 2015.
 Yang Tianyi Rejected from selection on December 4, 2015.
 Ye Wanyi Rejected from selection on December 4, 2015.
 Zhao Yunhui Rejected from selection on December 4, 2015.
 Peng Yuhan ( in Hunan) Transferred to CKG48 on September 1, 2018.
 Li Hailin (November 30 in Sichuan) Transferred to BEJ48 on November 8, 2018.
 Lu Jinghua Participant of the Unmask Plan, profile deleted on January 19, 2019.
 Lv Mengying ( in Shanghai) Graduated on January 19, 2019, unofficially resigned on February 15, 2018, held her last event on March 2. 
 Lin Xinyuan ( in Taizhou, Zhejiang) Graduated on January 19, 2019, unofficially resigned on February 3, 2018, held her last event on March 2.
 Sun Yaping ( in Hefei, Anhui) Graduated on January 19, 2019, unofficially resigned on March 24, 2018. 
 Liu Ying ( in Suizhou, Hubei) graduated on January 10, 2020, unofficially resigned on October 20, 2018.

Notes

References

 
SNH48
SNH48
SNH48